This is a partial list of molecules that contain 23 carbon atoms.

See also
 Carbon number 
 List of compounds with carbon number 22
 List of compounds with carbon number 24

C23